The Church of St. Hubert the Hunter and its associated library, also known as the Bondurant Protestant Episcopal Church were built in Bondurant, Wyoming, the church in 1940-41 and the library in 1943. The church was financed by the sale of a diamond bequeathed to the Episcopal Church by Mrs. John Markoe, which was to be sold to finance a memorial church.  According to some versions, the church was to be built in the most remote part of the United States.  Wyoming Bishop Winfred H. Zeigler suggested Bondurant, where he had been forced to take shelter from a blizzard while traveling in 1937. The diamond was sold for $1400, and Zeigler returned to Bondurant to organize the construction of the church by local volunteers.

The rustic log church and library function as a community center for Bondurant. The church is operated by St. John's Episcopal Church in Jackson.

References

External links
The Church of St. Hubert the Hunter and Library at the Wyoming State Historic Preservation Office

Churches on the National Register of Historic Places in Wyoming
Rustic architecture in Wyoming
Buildings and structures in Sublette County, Wyoming
Episcopal churches in Wyoming
Churches completed in 1940
20th-century Episcopal church buildings
Library buildings completed in 1943
National Register of Historic Places in Sublette County, Wyoming
1940 establishments in Wyoming